is a former Japanese football player.

Club statistics

References

External links

J. League (#26)

1992 births
Living people
Association football people from Ishikawa Prefecture
Japanese footballers
J1 League players
J2 League players
Sanfrecce Hiroshima players
V-Varen Nagasaki players
Júbilo Iwata players
Association football midfielders